Medina Sabakh Arrondissement is an arrondissement of the Nioro du Rip Department in the Kaolack Region of Senegal.

Subdivisions
The arrondissement is divided administratively into rural communities and in turn into villages.

Arrondissements of Senegal
Kaolack Region